Fluxinella membranacea is a species of extremely small deep water sea snail, a marine gastropod mollusk in the family Seguenziidae.

Description
The size of the shell varies between 2.5 mm and 3.4 mm.
Its shell has "a smooth spire, flattened summit, persistent shoulder angulation, and distinctly overhung umbilical wall."

Distribution
This marine species occurs off the Philippines and New Caledonia.

References

 Marshall B. A. 1991 — Mollusca Gastropoda: Seguenziidae from New Caledonia and the Loyalty Islands, in CROSNIER A & BOUCHET P. (eds) Résultats des Campagnes MUSORSTOM, Volume 7. Mémoires du Muséum national d’Histoire naturelle 150: 41-109.

External links
 To Encyclopedia of Life
 To USNM Invertebrate Zoology Mollusca Collection
 To World Register of Marine Species
 

membranacea
Gastropods described in 1991